is a Japanese politician serving in the House of Representatives in the Diet (national legislature) as a member of the Liberal Democratic Party. A native of Osaka, Osaka and graduate of the University of Tokyo he was elected for the first time in 1976 as a member of the now-defunct party New Liberal Club. His father is Kaoru Chūma, former mayor of Osaka.

References

External links 
  

1936 births
Living people
People from Osaka
University of Tokyo alumni
Members of the House of Representatives from Osaka Prefecture
Government ministers of Japan
Liberal Democratic Party (Japan) politicians
New Liberal Club politicians
21st-century Japanese politicians